Johann Heinrich von Anethan (1618–1693) was a Roman Catholic prelate who served as Auxiliary Bishop of Cologne (1680–1693), Auxiliary Bishop of Trier (1676–1680), and Auxiliary Bishop of Hildesheim (1665–1676).

Biography
Johann Heinrich von Anethan was born in Trier, Germany in 1618.
On 6 July 1665, he was appointed during the papacy of Pope Alexander VII as Titular Bishop of Hierapolis in Isauria and Auxiliary Bishop of Hildesheim.
On 21 September 1665, he was consecrated bishop by Max Heinrich von Bayern, Archbishop of Cologne. 
On 13 November 1676, he was appointed during the papacy of Pope Innocent XI as Auxiliary Bishop of Trier.
On 6 February 1680, he was appointed during the papacy of Pope Innocent XI as Auxiliary Bishop of Cologne.
He served as Auxiliary Bishop of Cologne until his death on 18 June 1693.

Episcopal succession
While bishop, he was the principal consecrator of:
Johann Hugo von Orsbeck, Titular Archbishop of Larissa in Thessalia and Coadjutor Archbishop of Trier (1677);
Anselm Franz von Ingelheim, Archbishop of Mainz (1680);
Johann Philipp Burkhard, Titular Bishop of Tripolis in Phoenicia and Auxiliary Bishop of Speyer (1685);
and the principal co-consecrator of:
Damian Hartard von Leyen-Hohengeroldseck, Archbishop of Mainz (1676);
Adolph Gottfried Volusius, Titular Bishop of Diocletiana and Auxiliary Bishop of Mainz (1676); and
Wilhelm Egon von Fürstenberg, Bishop of Strasbourg (1683).

References

External links and additional sources
 (for Chronology of Bishops) 
 (for Chronology of Bishops)  

17th-century German Roman Catholic bishops
Bishops appointed by Pope Alexander VII
Bishops appointed by Pope Innocent XI
1618 births
1693 deaths